The Fire Museum of Greater Cincinnati, also known as the Cincinnati Fire Museum, preserves and exhibits Greater Cincinnati, Ohio's firefighting artifacts and honors firefighters, both past and present.

Over 200 years of firefighting history is on display in the Fire Museum of Greater Cincinnati. Exhibits include examples of early leather fire buckets, an 1808 fire drum, the oldest surviving fire engine in Cincinnati, and an 1836 hand pumper. The museum also features and interactive exhibit that allows visitors to experience a modern Emergency-One fire engine cab by wailing the siren, ringing the bell, and flashing the lights.

Court Street Firehouse
The fire museum is housed in the restored 1906 Court Street Firehouse at 315 West Court Street (near Plum Street in Downtown Cincinnati).  The firehouse was part of the Cincinnati Fire Department. The Court Street Firehouse is a registered historic building, listed in the National Register on July 18, 1974.

Notes

External links
 
 Fire Museum of Greater Cincinnati - official site
 Documentation from the University of Cincinnati

Museums in Cincinnati
History museums in Ohio
Firefighting museums in the United States
National Register of Historic Places in Hamilton County, Ohio
Cincinnati Local Historic Landmarks
Fire stations on the National Register of Historic Places in Ohio
Defunct fire stations in Ohio
Fire stations completed in 1907
1907 establishments in Ohio
National Register of Historic Places in Cincinnati
Renaissance Revival architecture in Ohio